Sarmaşık can refer to:

 Sarmaşık, Bilecik
 Sarmaşık, Çaycuma
 Sarmaşık, Eğil
 Sarmaşık, Ilgaz
 The Turkish name for Ivy (2015 film)